What Became Of Me is the third and final studio album by American rock band Roses Are Red.

Track listing
 "These Days" (3:47)
 "Failing" (3:14)
 "Giving It All Tonight" (3:47)
 "Show Your Eyes" (3:56)
 "The Last Time (Come With Me Tonight)" (4:13)
 "Bring Me Down" (3:55)
 "Remember Me (It's Happening)" (4:02)
 "Running Out Of Time" (3:33)
 "Just Say The Words" (4:23)
 "What Became Of Me" (4:41)
 "Where I've Been" (3:53)

B-Sides
 "We Never Knew" (featured on the Trustkill Takeover Vol. II compilation)

Personnel
Vincent Minervino - vocals/piano
Michael Lasaponara - drums
Kevin Mahoney - bass guitar
Shaun Murphy - guitar
Tom Zenns - guitar

References

2006 albums
Roses Are Red (band) albums